Ouled Sellam council "Commune" is situated in north-eastern Algeria, about 70 km on the RN77 way north-west of Batna province by the borders with "Setif". The main village is called M'cil, where the local council and schools are, also a hospital and a football stadium.

Communes of Batna Province
Cities in Algeria
Algeria